Varuna is a Hindu god. Varuna may also refer to:

Places
 Varuna River, a minor tributary of the Ganges River in India
 Varuna Village, a village in Mysore district of India 
 20000 Varuna, a trans-Neptunian object

Vessels
 , two vessels
 , an Indian Navy sail training vessel
 SS Varuna, a steamship operating in Canada - see Murray Canal

People
 Varuna Shetty, 21st century Indian actress
 Varuna Waragoda (born 1971), Sri Lankan first-class cricketer

Other uses
 Varuna (crab), a genus of thoracotrematan crabs
 Varuna naval exercises, annual exercises involving the French and Indian navies
 Canadian Vickers Varuna, a Canadian flying boat of the 1920s
 Varuna, The Writers' House, former home of novelist Eleanor Dark, now a writers' centre in Katoomba, New South Wales, Australia
 Varuna (book), a 1907 political literature book by German social Darwinist and racialist Willibald Hentschel
 Varuna (album), debut album by indie rock band The Republic Of Wolves

See also
 Piz Varuna, a mountain in the Alps on the border between Italy and Switzerland